Gerard Johannes Kleisterlee (born 28 September 1946) is a Dutch businessman and engineer. He is the chairman of Vodafone, and the former president and CEO of Philips.

Early life
Born in Germany in 1946 to Dutch and German parents, he was raised in the Netherlands. He was educated at a Jesuit-run Canisius College in Nijmegen, followed by the Eindhoven University of Technology, where he earned a degree in electronic engineering. He received an MBA from the University of Pennsylvania's Wharton Business School in 1991. He attended the program for executive development at the Swiss business school International Institute for Management Development (IMD) in Lausanne.

Career
Trained as an electronics engineer, like his father, he worked at Philips for almost all of his life. From 1981 to 1986 he was general manager of Philips' Professional Audio Product Group. Kleisterlee joined Philips Components in 1986. After becoming general manager of Philips Display Components for Europe. He was appointed Managing Director of Philips Display Components Worldwide in 1994. He became president of Philips Taiwan and Regional Manager for Philips Components in Asia-Pacific in 1996. From September 1997 through June 1998 he was also responsible for all the activities of the Philips Group in China. He served on the Hong Kong Chief Executive's Council of International Advisers from 1998 to 2005.

He was determined not only to transform Philips' image with consumers but also turn it into a high-growth, high-tech company, something that more than 10 years of restructuring, under two predecessors, failed to do. As CEO he:
Replaced all of the top executives at Philips' American consumer-electronics division
Outsourced the production of mobile phone handsets and VCRs
Slashed overhead
Forced divisions to share services to achieve cost savings
Spun off the volatile semiconductors business into a separate entity NXP Semiconductors, and then sold a controlling 80.1% stake to a consortium of private equity investors

He was succeeded by Frans van Houten as CEO of Philips in April 2011. A director of Dell, Kleisterlee was nominated as the successor at Vodafone to chairman John Bond in January 2011, a position he assumed in July 2011. He was awarded an Honorary doctorate from the Catholic University of Leuven in 2005. He was named 2006 Europe Businessman of the Year by Fortune.

Personal life
He is married, with three children.

References

External links
Philips biography

1946 births
Living people
People from Eindhoven
Dutch chief executives in the technology industry
Dutch chief executives in the manufacturing industry
Dutch corporate directors
Dutch engineers
Dutch businesspeople
Philips employees
Wharton School of the University of Pennsylvania alumni
Place of birth missing (living people)
Vodafone people